Joachim Herrmann (19 December 1932 – 25 February 2010) was a German historian, archaeologist, scientist, and institutional director. He was a noted scholar in East Germany (GDR) who specialized in Slavic archaeology.

Early life 
In 1932, Herrmann was born in the village of Lübnitz in the district of Bad Belzig, Germany to a farming and milling family. He graduated from high school in Belzig. From 1951 to 1955, he studied history and prehistory at the Humboldt University of Berlin. He presented his doctoral dissertation in 1958 on the subject of the prehistoric and protohistoric fortifications of Greater Berlin and the district of Potsdam. His advisor was Karl-Heinz Otto.

Career 
In 1956, Herrmann became a research assistant at the Institute for Prehistory and Early History of the German Academy of Sciences at Berlin (DAW). He was promoted to senior research assistant in 1960. In 1964, he became a scientific work manager. Herrmann's habilitation or residency took place in December 1965, resulting in a thesis about archaeological excavations relating to "Slavic archaeology". In 1969, Herrmann became a professor at DAW. In 1971, he was awarded the National Prize of the German Democratic Republic (II. Class).

Later, he was appointed head director of the newly created Central Institute for Ancient History and Archaeology (ZIAGA) at the renamed Academy of Sciences of the GDR (AdW). He was selected for this position over his mentor Karl-Heinz Otto because of his vision for a centralized academic institution. Herrmann held the position until the reunification of Germany in 1990. 

After the reunification of Germany, the East German academic institutions where Herrmann worked were restructured or closed. His work, status, and authority as a scholar was publicly criticized, making it difficult for him to continue his academic career. After his retirement in 1992, his national and international reputation declined. He became the secretary for the social sciences and humanities class of the Leibniz Association from 1993 to 2008. In 2009, the Leibniz Association awarded the Daniel Ernst Jablonski Medal to Herrmann. A year later he died in Berlin.

Professional affiliations 
In 1970, Herrmann helped organize the second International Congresses for Slavic Archaeology by (UIAS). He was a member of the Bulgarian Academy of Sciences, the German Academy of Sciences at Berlin (AdW), the German Archaeological Institute, the Polish Academy of Sciences, and the Ukrainian Academy of Sciences. He was also an honorary member of the Polish Archaeological Society and a member of the presidium of the Historians' Society of the GDR.

In 1985 he became a member of the International Committee of Historical Sciences (CISH). After his five-year re-election in September 1990, he was the only German representative, causing a protest from West German archaeologists. From 1986 to 1990, Herrmann was president of Urania.

Awards 

 1971 – National Prize of the German Democratic Republic (II. Class) 
 1981 – Hero of Labour, German Democratic Republic
 1990 – Honorary doctorate, University of Athens
 2009 – Daniel Ernst Jablonski Medal, Leibniz Association

Legacy 
Herrmann remains an ambivalent figure in science. The so-called "Herrmann Era" from1969 to 1990 was "characterized by the attempt to anchor the communist state ideology in research and teaching and by a more intense broad effect". At the time, his habilitation thesis (1965–68) was the only one of it caliber to "adequately implement Marxism". 

The period 1989  through 1991 was a time of massive public criticism of Hermann's "historical propagandist activity". He obtained his position at Central Institute for Ancient History and Archaeology (ZIAGA) because of his professional achievements and organizational skills, along with his support of the system of East Germany and his membership in the Socialist Unity Party of Germany (SED) since 1954. Under his leadership, ZIAGA  became the most important research institute in the GDR for classical studies. However, it was difficult for scientists to have a career under Herrmann if they were not members of the SED or were viewed suspiciously by the government. However, Herrmann sometimes placed long-term scientific research and projects above politics.

Although he was an editor and author, Herrmann was more of a desk scholar because of his administrative duties. The East German "Slavic archaeology" research of the history, culture, and contribution of Early Slavs in East-Central Europe, specifically within the East German borders, is inevitably linked to Herrmann. However, this research was also ideologically and politically motivated; based on Marxist archaeology, historical materialism, anti-Ostforschung, and pro-socialist bloc Pan-Slavism. 

Herrmann was not academically critical when developing his theories on several early, distinct, and major waves of immigration of the early medieval West Slavs into the East German territory, proposing that they had almost the same cultural, societal and structural level of development as Germanic peoples. He "deliberately distorted the view of history for political reasons...stubbornly holding on to the old interpretation after the dendrochronological dating of the constructions became known".

Hermann's scholarly research is best summarized in a five-volume monograph on the excavations in the Slavic period settlement chamber at Ralswiek on Rügen Island.

Bibliography 
 Kultur und Kunst der Slawen in Deutschland von 7. bis 13. Jahrhundert. Institut für Vor- und Frühgeschichte Berlin 1965
 Tornow und Vorberg: Ein Beitrag zur Frühgeschichte der Lausitz. Akademie-Verlag, Berlin, 1966
 Siedlung, Wirtschaft und gesellschaftliche Verhältnisse der slawischen Stämme zwischen Oder/Neisse und Elbe: Studien auf der Grundlage archäologischen Materials. Akademie-Verlag, Berlin, 1968
 Zwischen Hradschin und Vineta: Frühe Kulturen der Westslawen. Urania, Leipzig-Jena-Berlin 1971
 Die germanischen und slawischen Siedlung und das mittelalterliche Dorf von Tornow, Kr. Calau. Akademie-Verlag, Berlin, 1973
 Spuren des Prometheus: Der Aufstieg der Menschheit zwischen Naturgeschichte und Weltgeschichte. Urania, Leipzig-Jena-Berlin 1975
 Wikinger und Slawen: Zur Frühgeschichte der Ostseevölker. Akademie-Verlag, Berlin 1982
 Editor: Die Slawen in Deutschland: Geschichte und Kultur der slawischen Stämme westlich von Oder und Neiße vom 6. bis 12. Jahrhundert. Akademie-Verlag, Berlin 1985
 Die Slawen in der Frühgeschichte des deutschen Volkes. Georg-Eckert-Institut für Internationale Schulbuchforschung, Braunschweig 1989.

Notes

References 
 Brather, Sebastian (2010). "Prof. Dr. Joachim Herrmann 19.12.1932–25.2.2010". Zeitschrift für Archäologie des Mittelalters (38), pp. 211–214.
 Brather, Sebastian (2010). "Herrmann, Joachim". Germanische Altertumskunde Online. De Gruyter
 Brather, Sebastian (2013). "Joachim Herrmann (1932–2010)". In: Friedrich Beck, Klaus Neitmann (Hrsg.): Lebensbilder brandenburgischer Archivare und Historiker. Landes-, Kommunal- und Kirchenarchivare, Landes-, Regional- und Kirchenhistoriker, Archäologen, Historische Geografen, Landes- und Volkskundler des 19. und 20. Jahrhunderts (= Brandenburgische historische Studien. Band 16). be.bra-wiss.-verl. Berlin, ISBN 978-3-937233-90-1, pp. 655–661.
 Donat, Peter and Gramsch, Bernhard and Klengel, Horst (2010). "Joachim Herrmann (1932–2010)". Bericht der Römisch-Germanischen Kommission 91, pp. 7–21.
 Gringmuth-Dallmer, Eike (2017). "Between Science and Ideology: Aspects of Archaeological Research in the Former GDR Between the End of World War II and the Reunification", pp. 235–273. In Archaeology of the Communist Era: A Political History of Archaeology of the 20th Century, ed. Ludomir R. Lozny. Springer. ISBN 978-3-319-45106-0
 Jäger, Klaus-Dieter (2010). "Nachruf auf Prof. Dr. Joachim Herrmann". Sitzungsberichte der Leibniz-Sozietät der Wissenschaften zu Berlin. Vol 107, pp. 172–175
 Kilger, Christoph (1998). "The Slavs Yesterday and Today: Different Perspectives on Slavic Ethnicity in German Archaeology". CSA. Vol. 6, pp. 99–114
 Kluger, Anne (2020). "Between pottery and politics? "Slavic archaeology" in communist Poland and East Germany and its interrelations with politics and ideology. A biographical-comparative approach". Studia Historiae Scientiarum (19), pp. 287–326.
 Kluger, Anne (2021). "“Honecker's Vassal” or a Prehistorian in the Service of Science? The Evaluation of Former East German Scholarship and the Concept of the Scholar in the Debate on Joachim Herrmann in Reunified Germany". Berichte zur Wissenschaftsgeschichte. Vol 44 (4), pp. 391–414
 Mertens, Lothar (2006). Lexikon der DDR-Historiker. Biographien und Bibliographien zu den Geschichtswissenschaftlern aus der Deutschen Demokratischen Republik. Saur, München, ISBN 3-598-11673-X, pp. 285.
 Nowak, Benjamin (2009, 2010). Kritik an historischen und archäologischen Quellen am Beispiel der slawischen Besiedlung Mitteleuropas. GRIN Verlag. München. ISBN 3640655990
 Scholkmann, Barbara (2013). "The discovery of the hidden Middle Ages: the research history of medieval archaeology in Germany". PCA 3, pp. 323–347
 Vierhaus, Rudolf (2011). "Herrmann, Joachim". Deutsche Biographische Enzyklopädie Online. De Gruyter
 Willing, Matthias (1991). Althistorische Forschung in der DDR. Duncker & Humblot, Berlin, ISBN 3-428-07109-3

External links 
 Profile at BBAW
 

1932 births
2010 deaths
German archaeologists
Members of the German Academy of Sciences at Berlin
People from Bad Belzig
Recipients of the National Prize of East Germany
Socialist Unity Party of Germany members